Chah Barf (also Romanized as Chāh Barf; also known as Chāhbar) is a village in Kharaqan-e Sharqi Rural District, Abgarm District, Avaj County, Qazvin Province, Iran. At the 2006 census, its population was 105, in 26 families.

References 

Populated places in Avaj County